Esther Hill Hawks (August 4, 1833 – May 6, 1906) was an American teacher, doctor, and activist during the Civil War.

Biography
She was born in Hooksett, New Hampshire. After becoming enthralled with her husband John Milton Hawks's medical books, she studied at the New England Female Medical College in Boston and graduated in 1857 with a medical degree. However, despite her growing medical knowledge, Hawks was denied a position as either an army doctor or army nurse. Hawks began to volunteer in hospitals and later taught in South Carolina as her husband moved there for a physician role. Her teaching role grew to include former slaves and in turn the first official black regiment. After her husband became involved with an established hospital for people of color in Beaufort, South Carolina, she found a more clinical role tending to soldiers while her husband was busy or away, while hiding how large her role was, due to the social stigma of a woman with such a powerful role tending to black patients.

Between South Carolina and Florida, Hawks continued to occupy her time through medical volunteering and educating black individuals. After some time, Hawks began to question her involvement in society, feeling as though she was "wasting time which should be devoted to my profession". She also began to mourn her maternal instinct and inability to have children. Her frustration became devotion towards teaching and personal relationships which she formed with her students and patients. Many times, Hawks highlighted the bare lives black children and former slaves lead with feelings of sadness and a goal to help them as much as possible. Hawks writes of her "scholars" as well behaving and likely to obey. She highlighted the lack of disciplinary measures and "revolts" her school leads with pride. Although she taught equally and integrated both white and black students in the same class, not all parents agreed with her integrative methods and were opposed to her actions. A primary response to this was withdrawal of their student. It is noted that Hawks was always saddened but accepting of everyone's ideals although she worked to integrate African Americans.

After returning to Massachusetts, Hawks began her own medical practice and treated mostly women with gynecological cases. During this time, she worked in various organizations including the New England Hospital Medical Society and Lynn Woman's Club while working to better the sanitary conditions of her community, provide further education, and promote women's rights.

Becoming ill in 1906, Esther Hawks grew progressively worse and died in her home in Lynn, Massachusetts while her husband continued promoting much of her same ideals.

References

External links
Esther Hill Hawks papers at the Library of Congress

1833 births
American gynecologists
1906 deaths
19th-century American women educators
19th-century American educators
Schoolteachers from South Carolina
Boston University School of Medicine alumni
Physicians from Massachusetts
19th-century American women physicians
19th-century American physicians
American diarists
Women diarists
American women memoirists
19th-century American women writers
People from Hooksett, New Hampshire
19th-century American memoirists